I've Got a New Woman is an album by American jazz organist Jimmy McGriff featuring performances recorded in late 1967 and originally released on the Solid State label.

Reception

AllMusic rated the album 3 stars out of 5.

Track listing
All compositions by Jimmy McGriff except as indicated
 "I've Got a Woman"(Ray Charles) - 2:37
 "Kiko" - 3:44
 "All About My Girl" - 2:43
 "Ode to Billy Joe" (Bobbie Gentry) - 2:37
 "The Days of Wine and Roses" (Johnny Mercer, Henry Mancini) - 2:41
 "Tennessee Waltz" (Redd Stewart, Pee Wee King) - 2:30
 "You Are My Sunshine" (Jimmie Davis, Charles Mitchell) - 2:09
 "The Swingin' Shepherd Blues" (Moe Koffman) - 2:35
 "What's That" - 2:06
 "When I Grow Too Old to Dream" (Sigmund Romberg, Oscar Hammerstein II - 3:43
 "Embraceable You" (George Gershwin, Ira Gershwin) - 3:30

Personnel
Jimmy McGriff - organ
Arthur "Fats" Theus - tenor saxophone
Thornell Schwartz - guitar 
Willie "Saint" Jenkins - drums

References

 

Solid State Records (jazz label) albums
Jimmy McGriff albums
1967 albums
Albums produced by Sonny Lester